The Dragon Chronicles – The Maidens, also known as The Maidens of Heavenly Mountains, Semi-Gods and Semi-Devils, and The Dragon Chronicles – The Maidens of Heavenly Mountains, is a 1994 Hong Kong film loosely based on Louis Cha's novel Demi-Gods and Semi-Devils. The film's plot centers on the story of Hui-juk, one of the three protagonists of the novel. The film was directed by Andy Chin and starred Brigitte Lin, Gong Li, Sharla Cheung, Frankie Lam and Norman Chui.

Cast
 Note: Some of the characters' names are in Cantonese romanisation.

 Brigitte Lin as Lei Chau-shui / Lei Chong-hoi
 Gong Li as Mou Hang-wan (Tin-san Tung-lo)
 Sharla Cheung as Ah-tsi
 Frankie Lam as Hui-juk
 Norman Chui as Ting Chun-chau
 Ku Tin-yi
 Liu Kai-chi as So Sing-ho
 James Pak as Tai-hung

External links
 
 
 

1994 films
Films based on works by Jin Yong
Hong Kong martial arts films
1990s Cantonese-language films
Wuxia films
Films set in the Liao dynasty
Films set in the Western Xia
Films based on Demi-Gods and Semi-Devils
1990s Hong Kong films